The 2000 Mar del Plata Sevens was a rugby sevens tournament that took place at the Estadio José María Minella in Mar del Plata between the 12–13 January 2000. It was the fourth edition of the Mar del Plata Sevens and was also the fourth round of the held in Argentina as the fourth round of the 1999–2000 World Sevens Series.

During the tournament, the first draw in the series history occurred when Samoa and Australia played out an 14-all draw in Pool D. In the cup final, Fiji took out their second cup final of the season defeating New Zealand 26-14. The hosts (Argentina) took out the plate while Spain won the bowl.

Teams
Sixteen national teams played in the Mar Del Plata Sevens with the national teams being the same teams as in the previous round which was held in Punta del Este.

Format
The pool stage was played on the first day of the tournament. The 16 teams were separated into four pools of four teams and teams in the same pool played each other once. The top two teams in each pool advanced to the Cup quarterfinals to compete for the 2000 Mar del Plata Sevens title.

Summary
The opening day of the 2000 Mar del Plata sevens saw the first draw in the series history with Samoa and Australia recording a 14-all draw in the final match of the day. Earlier results though put Samoa top of Pool D by a single point over Australia. New Zealand continued their form in the series, conceding only seven points (against France) in the pool stage to finish top of Pool B with France joining them. Fiji finished top of Pool A with wins over Germany (56–5), Uruguay (61–7) and Canada (40–14) with Canada joining them in second place. The final pool saw South Africa finish top of the pool with hosts, Argentina coming in second place.

Day 2 saw an Fiji and New Zealand final for the fourth tournament in a row after both teams recorded victories in their quarters and semis to make it to the cup final. For Fiji they defeated France 47–7 before knocking off Samoa in the semi-finals 19–7. New Zealand recorded a victory over Canada in the quarter-finals before defeating first-time cup semi-finalists, Australia with Australian coach, Glen Ella stating, "It was good to finally break through". In the cup final, it was Fiji who defeated New Zealand to tie the series after four rounds after coming back from 14–0 down to win 26–14. Hosts, Argentina won the plate final while Spain won the bowl defeating Chile.

Pool stages

Pool A

Source: World Rugby

Source: World Rugby

Pool B

Source: World Rugby

Source: World Rugby

Pool C

Source: World Rugby

Source: World Rugby

Pool D

Source: World Rugby

Source: World Rugby

Finals

Bowl

Source: World Rugby

Plate

Source: World Rugby

Cup

Source: World Rugby

Tournament placings

Source: Rugby7.com

References

External links
 

2000
2000 rugby sevens competitions
2000 in Argentine rugby union
January 2000 sports events in South America